Jonas Wieszt (born 3 August 1992, in Schwäbisch Hall) is a German footballer who currently plays for TSV Ilshofen.

External links
 

1992 births
Living people
People from Schwäbisch Hall
Sportspeople from Stuttgart (region)
German footballers
Association football goalkeepers
3. Liga players
VfB Stuttgart II players
Footballers from Baden-Württemberg